Lezha is a rural locality (a settlement) in Sidorovskoye Rural Settlement, Gryazovetsky District, Vologda Oblast, Russia. The population was 343 as of 2002. There are 7 streets.

Geography 
The distance to Gryazovets is 35 km, to Sidorovo is 23 km. Zasechnoye is the nearest rural locality.

References 

Rural localities in Gryazovetsky District